The Davenport Hotel is a historic building located in downtown Davenport, Iowa, United States. It was individually listed on the National Register of Historic Places in 1983. In 2020 it was included as a contributing property in the Davenport Downtown Commercial Historic District. It is currently an apartment building called The Davenport.

History
Stockholders incorporated the Davenport Hotel Company in 1905 to construct a modern hotel that was roughly equidistance from the city's two passenger depots. The construction of the Davenport Hotel in 1907 ushered in the third phase of hotel construction in the city of Davenport. It replaced the Kimball House as Davenport's finest hotel. The other hotels that belong to this era are the Dempsey Hotel (1913), the Hotel Blackhawk (1915) and the Hotel Mississippi (1931). It was considered the first "modern" hotel in the city, and was touted as one of the finest hotels in the Mississippi River Valley when it opened. The hotel featured such amenities as "fireproof" construction, elevators, a dining room, and sample rooms for traveling salesmen. The building's interior also featured "steam heat, hot and cold water, telephones and electric lights, heavy brass bedsteads with box springs and hair mattresses, velvet carpets and fancy window draperies, quartered oak and Flemish oak furniture, mahogany combination tables and writing desks and beveled mirrors." It was also the first of Davenport's "tall buildings."

The Davenport was built a block away from the new Rock Island Railroad station making it convenient for travelers. However, it was undermined by the Dempsey Hotel, which was built next to the station and provided moderately priced rooms. The more elegant Hotel Blackhawk also resulted in a loss of business to the Davenport and the hotel was sold to the Blackhawk Hotel company in 1916. The hotel was damaged in a large fire in 1939.

The building remained a hotel into the 1960s, but it eventually became an apartment building. It was extensively renovated in the mid-1980s at a cost of $5.5 million.

Architecture
The Davenport Hotel was designed by a local architecture firm, Temple and Burrows with P.T. Burrows as the architect in charge. They were also responsible for the Hotel Blackhawk, the Union Savings Bank and Trust (1924), and the Federal Court House (1932–1933).  
  
The building is six stories in height and was constructed in brick over a steel structure. It most likely has a concrete and brick foundation. The building's character is defined by its form as its decorative elements are more reserved. The six-story "towers" surround a two-story entrance in the center, which creates a sense of mass and enclosure. The building's exterior decorative elements were confined to a cornice, which is now gone, and the main entrance. It's possible the cornice was lost in the 1939 fire. The first floor of the building contains retail space and apartments on the upper floors.

References

External links

Hotel buildings completed in 1907
Apartment buildings in Davenport, Iowa
Hotel buildings on the National Register of Historic Places in Iowa
Residential buildings on the National Register of Historic Places in Iowa
National Register of Historic Places in Davenport, Iowa
Individually listed contributing properties to historic districts on the National Register in Iowa